Gamicon is Iowa's longest-running non-gambling game convention, currently held at the Marriott Hotel in Cedar Rapids, Iowa. Gamicon ALPHA was sponsored by the Science Fiction League of Iowa Students (SFLIS).  Gamicon later incorporated as a not-for-profit organization, then merged with the Mindbridge Foundation. Each Gamicon was numbered using the Greek alphabet until Gamicon Omega. After that, the conventions were named by their number on the Periodic Table.

Gamicon Gallium will be held on February 25–27, 2022 at the Cedar Rapids Marriott in Cedar Rapids, Iowa.

Gamicon features board games, card games, role-playing games, miniature games and computer games
Gamicon's attendance averages 500-600 attendees, and is the longest running gaming convention in Iowa.

Past Guests of Honor 
Alpha - 1991 - Roger Moore, Dragon Magazine
Beta - 1992 - Zeb and Helen Cook, TSR
Gamma - 1993 - Erick Wujcik, Amber RPG
Delta - 1994 - Jonathan Tweet, RPG Designer
Epsilon - 1995 - Cathy Klessig, Phage Press
Zeta - 1996 - Richard Tucholka, Tri Tac Systems & Cathy Klessig, Phage Press
Eta - 1997 - Aaron Allston & Lester Smith
Theta - 1998 - James Ernest, Cheapass Games
Iota - 1999 - John Blaska, Dragon Epic
Kappa - 2000 - Chris Clark, Inner City Games
Lambda - 2001 - Jonathan Tweet, RPG Designer
Mu - 2003 - Jolly Blackburn, Kenzer & Co.
Nu - 2004 - Shane Hensley, Deadlands
Xi - 2005 - Robert J. Schwalb, Green Ronin Publishing
Omicron - 2006 - Matt Snyder, Chimera Creative
Pi - 2007 - Luke Reed, Jerry Shomberg, Fantasy Flight Games
Rho - 2008 - Fantasy Flight Games
Sigma - 2009 - Brian Wood & Jeff Brawley, Hyperion Games
Tau - 2010 - King Zombie - Artist GOH, Tyler Walpole
Upsilon - 2011 - Guest Cancelled last minute - Artist GOH, Tyler Walpole
Phi - 2012 - Jay Tummelson, Rio Grande Games - Artist GOH, Tyler Walpole
Chi - 2013 - Clinton Boomer, RPG Writer - Artist GOH, Tyler Walpole
Psi - 2014 - Chris O'Neill & Dan Landis, Kobolds Ate My Baby - Artist GOH, Tyler Walpole
Omega - 2015 - Dan Proctor, Goblinoid Games - Artist GOH, Tyler Walpole
At which point we ran out of alphabet and moved to the Periodic table of the elements...
Manganese - 2016 - Curt Covert, Smirk & Dagger Games - Artist GOH, Tina Bongorno
Iron - 2017 - Ken Hite (Podcaster) - Artist GOH, Steven Groom
Cobalt - 2018 - Kane Klenko, Renegade Games - Artist GOH, Aaron Riley
Nickel - 2019 - Stephen Buonocore, Stronghold Games - Artist GOH, Terry Pavlet
Copper - 2020 - Clair Hoffman, D&D Adventurers League - Artist GOH, Steven Groom
Zinc - 2021 - VIRTUAL due to Covid. No guest.
Gallium - 2022 - Jon Lonngren, Fallen Dominion Studios

It is supported by the Mindbridge Foundation, which also supports Icon and AnimeIowa.

References

External links
 Official Website

Festivals in Iowa
Gaming conventions
Tourist attractions in Iowa City, Iowa